Hypomagnesemia with secondary hypocalcemia (HSH) is an autosomal recessive genetic disorder affecting intestinal magnesium absorption. Decreased intestinal magnesium reabsorption and the resulting decrease in serum magnesium levels is believed to cause lowered parathyroid hormone (PTH) output by the parathyroid gland. This results in decreased PTH and decreased serum calcium levels (hypocalcemia). This manifests in convulsions and spasms in early infancy which, if left untreated, can lead to mental retardation or death. HSH is caused by mutations in the TRPM6 gene.

Pathophysiology
HSH is caused by decreased intestinal magnesium reabsorption through TRPM6 channels. When expressed in cells, TRPM6 produces outwardly rectifying currents with the outward portion composed of Na+ ions and the inward portion of divalent cations (particularly magnesium and calcium). Inward flow of sodium ions is blocked by extracellular divalent cations. Increased intracellular magnesium concentrations also decrease current through TRPM6 channels. There are currently more than 30 known mutations in TRPM6 that are associated with HSH and these mutations are spreading throughout the gene (table 1). Of the eight HSH mutations that have been tested, none have shown to produce whole-cell current. The S141L mutation, one of the few missense mutations, has been of particular interest to researchers. They have found that it prevents coassembly with TRPM7 (and presumably other TRPM6 subunits) and lacks the ability to traffic to the membrane. Whether other mutants are able to traffic properly to the surface or coassemble has not yet been further studied.

While the hypomagnesemia in patients with HSH is a direct result of TRPM6 mutations, hypocalcemia is an indirect, secondary result. Parathyroid gland secretion of PTH can be altered by changes in serum magnesium levels. The decreased serum magnesium levels seen in HSH result in decreased PTH secretion. PTH, in turn, controls the availability of serum calcium. Decreasing PTH levels cause a decrease in calcium availability in serum and, thus, the neurological symptoms of HSH.

Diagnosis
Diagnosis typically occurs during the first 6 months of life due to characteristic neurological symptoms. These symptoms include muscle spasms, tetany, and seizures. Laboratory testing indicates hypomagnesemia (decreased serum magnesium levels), hypocalcemia (decreased serum calcium levels), and little to no measurable parathyroid hormone levels. Diagnosis is confirmed with these symptoms and can be further solidified with genetic sequencing of the TRPM6 gene.

Treatment
Treatment of HSH involves administration of high doses of magnesium salts. These salts may be taken orally or otherwise (e.g. subcutaneously). This treatment works by increasing magnesium absorption through the non-TRPM6 mediated paracellular uptake pathways. This treatment must be continued throughout life.

History
HSH was originally believed to be an X-linked disorder due to the preponderance of affected males. With the finding that mutations in TRPM6 (on chromosome 9) are causative for the disorder this is no longer the case. Of recent interest, however, is the characterization of a patient with symptoms similar to HSH who has a translocation of the chromosomes 9 and X.

See also
 Bartter's syndrome
 Gitelman syndrome
 Hypomagnesemia
 Hypocalcemia

References

Footnotes

External links 

Nephrology
Autosomal recessive disorders
Channelopathies
Calcium
Magnesium